Matthew John Beall (born 4 December 1977) is an English former footballer who played in the Football League for Cambridge United and Leyton Orient.

References

1977 births
Living people
English footballers
Association football midfielders
English Football League players
Norwich City F.C. players
Cambridge United F.C. players
Leyton Orient F.C. players
Dover Athletic F.C. players
Cambridge City F.C. players
Farnborough F.C. players